Cubanopyllus is a monotypic genus of Caribbean ground spiders containing the single species, Cubanopyllus inconspicuus. It was first described by G. Alayón G. & Norman I. Platnick in 1993, and has only been found in Cuba.

References

Gnaphosidae
Monotypic Araneomorphae genera
Spiders of the Caribbean
Endemic fauna of Cuba